Pontobelgrandiella bureschi is a species of gastropod belonging to the family Hydrobiidae.

The species is found in South Europe. The species inhabits freshwater environments.

References

Hydrobiidae